Lok Kwan Hoi  (15 April 1987, Chaozhou)is an Hong Kong rower. He won the gold medal in the Men's lightweight single sculls at the 2014 Asian Games.  He also compete in the men's lightweight double sculls at the 2012 Summer Olympics with Leung Chun Shek.

References

Hong Kong male rowers
Olympic rowers of Hong Kong
Rowers at the 2012 Summer Olympics
Rowers at the 2006 Asian Games
Rowers at the 2010 Asian Games
Rowers at the 2014 Asian Games
Asian Games medalists in rowing
Living people
Asian Games gold medalists for Hong Kong
1987 births
People from Chaozhou
Medalists at the 2014 Asian Games
Rowers from Guangdong
21st-century Hong Kong people